The Oklahoma Health Care Authority (OKHCA) is an agency of the government of Oklahoma responsible for providing health insurance benefits for the state's SoonerCare (Oklahoma Medicaid) members. The Authority is the state-level counterpart to the federal Centers for Medicare and Medicaid Services.

The Authority is led by a Board of Directors, composed of seven members appointed by the Governor of Oklahoma, the President pro tempore of the Oklahoma Senate, and the Speaker of the Oklahoma House of Representatives. The Governor appoints the Administrator of the Authority, who serves as the chief executive officer of the Authority, with the consent of the Senate. The Administrator serves at the pleasure of the Governor.

The Authority was created in 1993 during the term of Governor David Walters.

Leadership
The Oklahoma Health Care Authority is led by CEO, Rebecca Pasternik-Ikard under the direction of the Board of Directors.
The Board of Directors is the governing body of OHCA, which directs the actions and oversees the operation of the Authority. The Board is composed of seven members, with three appointed by the Governor of Oklahoma, two appointed by the President pro tempore of the Oklahoma Senate, and two appointed by the Speaker of the Oklahoma House of Representatives. Board members serves a four-year term without compensation. In making the appointments, the considerations must be given to urban, rural, gender and minority representation.

As of 2014, the current members of the Board are:

Duties
The Oklahoma Health Care Authority has the primary duty of executing SoonerCare, the Oklahoma version of Medicaid. SoonerCare is a health coverage program jointly funded by the United States federal government and the Oklahoma state government. The program provides payments to cover medical services to economically challenged individuals. OHCA determines financial eligibility for the program.

SoonerCare
SoonerCare is medical care delivered by OHCA as prescribed by the Social Security Act of 1965 (the Medicaid Act). The Federal Medicaid Act requires that certain medical services be delivered to recipients by hospitals and physicians. The State, however, is allowed to add other optional services, such as pharmacy services. With each of these programs, OHCA is responsible for setting compensation levels, services contained in each delivery system, contracts to deliver the services, and actuarial determinations regarding compensation. As of February 2012, those individuals covered by HCA comprise approximately 879,033 individuals across Oklahoma.

In order to be eligible to receive SoonerCare medical services from OHCA, an individual must meet any of the following requirements:
Adults with children under 19
Children under 19 and pregnant women
Individuals 65 and older
Individuals who are blind or who have disabilities
Women under 65 in need of breast or cervical cancer treatment
SoonerPlan - Men and women 19 and older with family planning needs

SoonerCare is a means tested program. State law provides that SoonerCare may cover individuals who have an annual income of equal to or less than 185% of the United States federal poverty level. OHCA contracts with Oklahoma Department of Human Services to determine eligibility for OHCA services. Additionally, OHCA actively works with the Office of the Oklahoma Attorney General's Medicaid Fraud Unit to prosecute fraudulent providers.

In September 2010, OHCA implemented an online system that uses an "enroll-first, verify-later" approach that automatically renews benefits for existing SoonerCare beneficiaries and enrolls new applicants if the system determines that they are likely to meet eligibility requirements. The program has streamlined enrollment processes, saving an estimated $1.5 million in operating costs and reducing the rate of those uninsured.

Insure Oklahoma
Insure Oklahoma is an employer sponsored insurance plan administered by OHCA which provides employers with premium subsidies to help buy health insurance for low to moderate income employees. Insure Oklahoma also provides a way for individuals who participate in the Individual Plan to gain access to an affordable health care option.

In April 2004, Senate Bill 1546 authorized the Oklahoma Health Care Authority to develop a program assisting employees of small businesses, 19 to 64 years of age with either:
a portion of their private health plan premiums (Employer Sponsored Insurance), or
the purchase of a state sponsored health plan operated under the state Medicaid program (Individual Plan).

In November 2004, the Oklahoma Health Care Initiative created the funding mechanism to fund Insure Oklahoma. SQ 713, passed by a statewide vote, increased the sales tax on tobacco products. A portion of these revenues were designated to be used to fund the new health program.

Organization
The Authority is divided into four service branches: Soonercare Operations, Financial Services, Information Services, and Legal Services.

Office of the Administrator - led by the Administrator of the Authority, immediate staff of the Administrator and provides policy direction for Authority and support to Board of Directors
Administrative Services - led by Administrator's Chief of Staff
Civil Rights/Freedom of Information Act Office
Policy, Planning and Integrity Office - led by Deputy Chief Executive Officer
Communications, Outreach and Reporting Office - led by Deputy Chief Executive Officer
SoonerCare Operations - led by Deputy State Medicaid Director
Medical Professional Support
Program Operations and Benefits
Quality Assurance/Quality Improvement
Opportunities for Living Life
Insure Oklahoma
Financial Services - led by Chief Financial Officer
Information Services - led by Chief Information Officer
Legal Services - led by General Counsel

Budget and Staff
The Oklahoma Health Care Authority has an annual budget over $5 billion, making OHCA one of the largest state agencies. OHCA also employs over 400 full-time employees.

References

External links
Oklahoma Health Care Authority official website
Insure Oklahoma official website

Health Care Authority
Health Care Authority
1993 establishments in Oklahoma